On 7 October 1989, a major incident in Swiss association football, known as the Klötzli incident, took place. The incident took place in a Nationalliga A match between FC Sion and FC Wettingen. The incident was caused by the referee blowing the end game whistle just as a tying goal was scored by Wettingen. The incident is considered to be one of the biggest scandals in Swiss football.

Background
The third minute of injury time in the league match in Stade Tourbillon between Sion and Wettingen was underway. A goal from Mirsad Baljic in the 88th minute led Sion to have a 1–0 lead against their opponents who, despite their win against FC Napoli a few days earlier, had been having financial difficulties and had been fighting against relegation.

The incident 
Sion's midfielder Jean-Paul Brigger took a relief free-kick just a few meters from his own penalty area. Instead of kicking the ball however, he delayed the kick and, as he took the kick, caused the ball to hit Wettingen's Salvatore Romano in the middle of his back. From there, the ball landed in front of the feet of Wettingen's captain Martin Rueda. He moved towards the Sion goal and beat the goal keeper Stephan Lehmann  to it, tying the game 1-1. While the ball was in the air and finding its way into the goal, however, referee Bruno Klötzli looked at his watch, and not at the ball, and noticed that the three-minute injury time had expired. He blew his whistle. The game ended, and the tying goal did not count.

The Wettinger players were stunned and angry. Their anger was directed towards referee Klötzli and the players chased him across the Sion stadium. Four FCW players then attacked the referee and in the confusing situation, Klötzli tried to tear himself away and protect himself, running to escape from the verbal and physical assaults. He then proceeded to kick and punch his way towards the stands and to the player entrance and into the referee's cabin.

People involved 
Referee Bruno Klötzli, an up and coming SFV referee, who would have become FIFA Referee in 1990. Klötzli reports the case to the SFV and his statements are tough. From his match report can be seen: player number 12 Martin Frei (the uncle of Alex Frei) attacked him by jumping into his legs with both feet. Player number 3 Alex Germann struck him with a first punch on the shoulder and a second punch in the stomach. Player number 9 Reto Baumgartner jumped into his back with both knees, whereupon the referee almost fell. Player number 6 Roger Kundert kicked him in the buttocks.

Statements 
"I was very scared," Klötzli said after the game. "If I had stumbled, I would certainly have ended up in the hospital." He got away unharmed. Up until the moment of his whistle he said: "I made no mistakes in terms of control technology. But I have to admit that the moment of the final whistle was not exactly well chosen psychologically."

"Sure, I ran over to him," confessed Kundert. "Maybe I touched the referee in the crowd. But I definitely didn't kick him. Anything but two or three penalty Sundays would be a scandal." Baumgartner described the situation like this: "I was totally aggressive, capable of doing anything. But I couldn't even get near to him." Germann said: "I'm quite sure I didn't strike him." After the players had seen the video of the event, they showed more insight. "The scenes that happened there are inexcusable," says Kundert. Baumgarnter stated that both he and Klötzli made a mistake.

Even 30 years later the then Sion team manager Yves Débonnaire remembers, "The anxious face of the poor referee Klötzli and the violence of the Wettinger players have burned into my brain. Forever."

Consequences 
On the basis of the video and the referee report, the SFV condemned the four players with extensive bans and fines. The Association Sports Court intensified the punishments and professional bans further. The professional ban for Roger Kundert was for four months. The ban for Martin Frei began at six and increased to eight months and the ban for Reto Baumgartner began at seven and increased to ten0 months. Each were fined 10,000 Swiss Francs. Alex Germann, who was about complete a transfer to Borussia Dortmund in the Bundesliga, was hit the hardest, with a one-year suspension and a fine of CHF 20,000 Swiss francs.

Ensuing events 
Just seven weeks after the game in Sion, Roger Kundert tore a cruciate ligament during training. Because his right knee could no longer withstand the stresses of professional sport, he retired from active football in the spring of 1990. The then 30-year-old Martin Frei vented his anger, wrote the association bosses a sharp letter and decided to end his career immediately. Alex Germann trained for a year with FC Wettingen and then returned as a professional player, but the planned move to the Bundesliga and Borussia Dortmund no longer came about.

Reto Baumgartner's contract with FC Wettingen expired. He then continued his career with FC Basel, played for another four years in the Nationalliga B and he later became a professional beach soccer player. Since FC Basel's AGM in 2008, Baumgartner is a member of the club's board of directors. At the club's annual general meeting in November 2020 he was elected as the new chairman.

Half a year later, referee Klötzli also ended his career as a referee. The Sion scandal was his last game at the professional level. Afterwards he became addicted to gambling. He landed into debt and ran into problems with his job, which he then lost. In 1999 he was sentenced to a conditional prison term of 18 months for forgery and abuse of confidence. As a bank employee, Klötzli embezzled a total of CHF 800,000 between 1990 and 1993. The former referee now lives in seclusion in the canton of Jura, where he ran a restaurant with his wife. They retired at the end of 2017.

Notes

References

Sources 
 SFL glory "der Fall Klötzli"
 Blick.ch interview in German with Bruno Klötzli, including video

External links 
 Swiss television SRF from 7 November 1989 with original video

1989–90 in Swiss football
FC Sion
FC Wettingen
Association football riots